Taoism or "Do" is thought to be the earliest state philosophy for the Korean people. However, its influence waned with the introduction of Buddhism during the Goryeo kingdom as the national religion and the dominance of neo-Confucianism during the Joseon dynasty. Despite its diminished influence during those periods, it permeated all strata of the Korean populace, integrating with its native animism as well as Buddhist and Confucian institutions, temples, and ceremonies. The Taoist practice in Korea developed, somewhat in contrast to China, as an esoteric meditative practice in the mountains taught by the "mountain masters" or "mountain sages".

One of Korea's well-known founding myths in which a tiger and a bear seek to become human during an encounter with Hwanung may be viewed as a Taoist parable. The exact origin, despite various theories by historians, is in question because the royal records maintained by the early Korean kingdoms were destroyed during the two occasions in which the royal libraries were burned by invading Chinese armies. Later attempts to study the history and philosophy of Korean Taoism were suppressed during the Joseon kingdom which embraced only Confucianism as the proper field of study.

Background 
Broadly speaking, Taoism, Confucianism and Buddhism infused native Totemism and Shamanism from the earliest centuries of the Common Era, but Buddhism dominated official thought during Silla and Goryeo dynasties, replaced by Confucianism during the Joseon Dynasty.

Korean Taoism was influenced by Confucianism and ancient Chinese folk religion.

Very little writing on Taoism survived prior to the 20th century. Until recently, Taoism in Korea received little attention from scholars, usually only described as a "romantic influence" or "literary theme" within other contexts.

Taoism's effects have been limited because of a lack of an institutional or political base, rejected by Confucian and Buddhist elites. Some modern scholars, however, are calling for a more critical reading of Confucianized histories, study of alternative sources, and a broader definition of Taoism, to find more extensive presence of Korean Taoist ritual practices and positive valuations.

Three Kingdoms period

Goguryeo 
Taoism first arrived in Korea in 624. Emperor Gaozu, the founder of China's Tang Dynasty, sent a Taoist preacher and literature, Laozi and Zhuangzi, to the Goguryeo kingdom. These were eagerly welcomed by the Goguryeo's king and his minister Yeon Gaesomun. Buddhist temples were eventually transformed to Taoist temples. However, this first enthusiasm lasted for only 30 years. Taoist symbols are found in Goguryeo tomb murals near Kangso, P'yongan-do.

Baekje 
In Baekje, Taoism was mentioned in some treatises in passing, and did not take hold as in the other Korean kingdoms.

Silla 
Silla, having received Lao-tzu's Tao Te Ching in 738 from the Tang emperor, left the most substantial legacy of Taoism.  Silla scholars went to China to study Taoism, and Lao-tzu was tested in civil service examinations. Sinseon Sasang, which was relatively widespread in Silla, had its roots in animistic folk beliefs and practices, but it was also influenced by Korean Taoism.

Silla Taoism concentrated on the practice and training of one's mind or self-discipline. Its most distinctive mark can be found in the Hwarang, an elite armed force noted for its disciplined composure, simplicity, relaxation and harmony, every one a component of philosophical Taoism.

Goryeo 
Taoism enjoyed its greatest popularity during the Goryeo Dynasty, especially in the court and the ruling class. Taoist court rituals were introduced into Korea from Song dynasty China, especially under King Yejong (r. 1105–1122). The object of worship in these rituals included most of the major and minor deities of the Taoist pantheon, but certain deities such as Samgye and T'aeil seem to have been the most popular.

By the mid period of the Goryeo Dynasty, Buddhism dominated Korea, subsuming other religions and philosophies, including Taoism.

Joseon 
The state religion under the Joseon Dynasty can be described as Neo-Confucianism, although not popular among the common people. At least at the start of the dynasty, Taoist literature was quite popular among groups of the intelligentsia. These writings on Taoism were predominantly from a Confucian perspective. However, there was a growing opposition from the Yi dynasty and Confucian political factions against Taoism, and Taoism began to be perceived as "heretical". However, Taoists were not as persecuted as Buddhists. Subsequently, the presence of Taoism shrank noticeably, and during the 1592 Japanese invasion, Taoism was systematically abolished.

In the 16th to 18th centuries, Taoism flourished, as literati, monks, private scholars (sarim), and even women, studied and practiced Taoist meditation and inner alchemy (naedan/Danhak) and produced hagiographic and anecdotal accounts of their Taoist contemporaries and forebears. The most important of these accounts known to date are four anecdotal biographies of immortals (Sason chon) in the collected writings of Heo Gyun (1569–1618), the Ch'onghakjip (Collected Discourses of Master Blue Crane) by Cho Yojok (early 17th century).

Commoners also practiced Taoism and liturgy among them often included invocations to Chinese Taoist deities.

While these were written to encourage Koreans to practice inner alchemy for the sake of immortality (i.e., deliverance from the corpse), they also re-envision and broaden the meaning of Korean religious history by reiterating nativist and folk traditions about the role of Korean mountain recluses and earthbound immortals in the maintenance and protection of Korean society.

Modern presence 
Since the late Joseon Dynasty, Taoism has been marginalized not only by the Korean Royal Court, Confucians, and Buddhists but also by society as a whole. Due to such a history, only a handful of Taoists exist throughout Korea today.

Taoism has been absorbed into the traditional Korean vision of the world, a world view in which shamanistic, Confucian, Buddhist, and Taoist elements are so intimately intertwined that often only a scholar can distinguish which is which.

Evidence of Taoist revival can be seen in Tanjeon Hoheup, Tonghak and Kouk Sun Do. Even if the term "Taoism" is not used, the terms, techniques, and goals are clearly Taoist. The Taoist mark of Chinese characters su (longevity) and bok (bliss) decorate many everyday articles, from spoons to pillow cases, even today. Many place names, especially related to mountains, bear strong Taoist influence.

The Taoist symbol Taegeuk is featured in the flag of South Korea, and Chondoism is the Korean religion with more presence in North Korea, when Chondoist people are represented in politics by Chondoist Chongu Party.

Starting December 2013 and ending in March 2014, the National Museum of Korea held an exhibit dubbed, "Taoist Culture in Korea: The Road to Happiness." The exhibit featured hundreds of pieces of Taoist art and other artifacts from earlier dynasties and kingdoms. One of the few notable artifacts present at the exhibition was the Baekje Gilt-Bronze Incense Burner, which is known for its heavy influence from Buddhism and Taoism.

Modern Korean Taoist organizations are often heavily inspired by Way of the Celestial Masters beliefs, and sometimes syncretize with shamanistic and other native Korean religious practices taken from antiquity to current times.

See also 
 Taoism
 Korean Buddhism
 Korean Confucianism
 Korean Shamanism
 Tonghak

References

Noted scholars 
 Yi Gyu-gyeong (1788–?) was a Silhak scholar wrote many articles on Taoism.
 Hwadam Seo Gyeong-deok
 Maewoldang Kim Si-seup

External links 
 Native Faiths in Korea
 Daoist Studies in Korea
 The Flag of South Korea
Collection: "Daoism/Taoism" from the University of Michigan Museum of Art
Exhibition on Taoist Culture in Korea: the road to happiness
Taoist Culture in Korea: The Road to Happiness
Baekje Gilt-Bronze Incense Burner

Religion in Korea
Korean philosophy
Korea
Korea